William P. Alford (Chinese name: 安守廉; An Shoulian) (born 1948) is a United States legal scholar. He is currently Henry L. Stimson Professor of Law and Vice Dean for the Graduate Program and International Legal Studies at Harvard Law School (Massachusetts, USA). He is Director of East Asian Legal Studies at Harvard Law, and is regarded as an expert in the field of Chinese law.

He is an honorary professor of Renmin University, Zhejiang University and the China National School of Administration, and an Honorary Fellow of the American Studies Institute of the Department of Law of the Chinese Academy of Social Sciences. He directed the China Center for American Law Study, the first academic program in U.S. law in the PRC, was a founder in 1982 of the U.S. Committee on Legal Education Exchange with China, is the recipient of a number of awards and fellowships for his work on China, and is on a host of advisory and editorial boards.

Biography
Alford received his B.A. degree from Amherst College in 1970, LL.B degree from the University of Cambridge in 1972.  He received M.A.s in Chinese Studies and Chinese History from Yale University in 1974 and 1975, respectively, and a J.D from Harvard Law School in 1977.

He has been involved for decades in China's legal reform. Almost 25 years ago, with Professor Randle Edwards, then of Columbia, he founded the first academic program in the PRC on American law and the first national exchange program to bring Chinese students to the U.S. for legal education—including many who are in the forefront of legal change in China today. In the years since, he has been called on by both the US government and China's—as well as multilateral organizations, foundations, civic groups and NGOs, law firms and businesses—to offer advice on a range of issues from trade to human rights to intellectual property to the legal profession and legal education and beyond. In recent years, he has focused on the pro bono work with the Special Olympics in issues of disability in China.

Personal life 
Professor Alford is married to Dr. Yuanyuan Shen, a lawyer, and an Associate in Research at the Fairbank Center for the East Asian Research of Harvard University since 1991. She is a graduate of People's University of China (now Renmin University of China) in Beijing, Harvard Law School, and the University of Wisconsin (Ph.D.). Her father was Shen Zulun, a governor of Zhejiang Province in China.

Professor Alford and his family live in Belmont, Massachusetts.

Selected publications

Books 

 Alford, William P., The Changing international legal order : a Chinese perspective, Los Angeles, Calif. : Academic Pub. Service, 1984
 Alford, William P.,To Steal a Book Is an Elegant Offense: Intellectual Property Law in Chinese Civilization, Stanford, Calif. : Stanford University Press, 1995. 
 Alford, William P., (editor), Raising the bar : the emerging legal profession in East Asia,  Cambridge, Mass. : East Asian Legal Studies, Harvard Law School, 2006.

Articles 

 Alford, William P.; Liebman, Benjamin. "Clean Air, Clean Processes? The Struggle Over Air Pollution Law in the People's Republic of China," 52 Hastings Law Journal 703 (2001).
 Alford, William P., "Exporting the 'Pursuit of Happiness'," 113 Harvard Law Review 1677 (2000)
 Alford, William P., "Have You Eaten, Have You Divorced? Debating the Meaning of Freedom in Marriage in China" in Realms of Freedom in Modern China (William C. Kirby ed., Stanford University Press, 2004).
 Alford, William P., "Of Lawyers Lost and Found: Searching for Legal Professionalism in the People's Republic of China" in Raising the Bar: The Emerging Legal Profession in East Asia (East Asian Legal Studies, Harvard Law School, 2007).

See also
 J. Mark Ramseyer: Professor of Japanese legal studies at HLS; member of East Asian Legal Studies advisory committee
 Jerome A. Cohen: New York University scholar (emeritus) of Chinese law
 Donald C. Clarke: George Washington University Law School expert on Chinese law
 Nicholas C. Howson: U.S. scholar of Chinese law at University of Michigan Law School
 Derk Bodde (1909–2003): U.S. sinologist and scholar of pre-modern Chinese law and society
 William C. Jones: former U.S. scholar of pre-modern Chinese law
 Institutes studying Chinese Law

References

External links
 Profile at Harvard Law School
 Special Section: Asian Journeys Why China?
 

Amherst College alumni
Alumni of the University of Cambridge
Yale Graduate School of Arts and Sciences alumni
Harvard Law School alumni
Harvard Law School faculty
American sinologists
Scholars of Chinese law
1948 births
Living people